Junkholz is a village in the canton of Thurgau, Switzerland.

It was first recorded in year 1324 as Junkholtz.

Junkholz is located in the former municipality Bissegg. In 1995 Bissegg municipality merged with its neighbor to form a new and larger municipality Amlikon-Bissegg.

References

Villages in Switzerland
Villages in Thurgau
States and territories established in 1324